Peace in Our Time is the eighth studio album by the Santa Cruz, California-based hardcore punk band Good Riddance, released April 21, 2015 through Fat Wreck Chords. It is the band's first studio album since their 2007 breakup and 2012 reunion.

Background and recording 
Good Riddance had broken up in 2007, but reunited in 2012. Singer Russ Rankin began writing songs for the band's eighth studio album in 2014. Peace in Our Time was recorded that November at Motor Studios in San Francisco, with Bill Stevenson serving as record producer and audio engineer. The album was mixed and mastered by Jason Livermore at The Blasting Room. The cover illustration was done by Chris Shary. At only 27 minutes long, it is the band's shortest album to date.

Regarding the recording of the album, Rankin said, "I don't know how I wrote songs before GarageBand on my Mac computer. Being able to sit down with my laptop, plug in my guitar and demo a whole song is incredible. It is awesome."

Release 
Peace in Our Time was released April 21, 2015 through Fat Wreck Chords. Music videos were released for the songs "Dry Season" and "Disputatio".

Track listing

Personnel

Good Riddance
 Russ Rankin – vocals
 Luke Pabich – guitar
 Chuck Platt – bass guitar
 Sean Sellers – drums

Production
 Bill Stevenson – producer, engineer
 Jason Livermore – mixing engineer, mastering
 Chris Shary – illustration
 Alan Snodgrass – photographs
 Sergie Loobkoff – layout and design

References 

2015 albums
Good Riddance (band) albums
Fat Wreck Chords albums
Albums produced by Bill Stevenson (musician)